The 2018–19 season was Bristol City's 121st season as a professional football club and their fourth consecutive season back in the Championship. Along with competing in the Championship, the club will also participated in the FA Cup and EFL Cup. The season was a largely successful one for the club, with City finishing in 8th place, just four points outside the playoff positions and the club's highest finish in the Championship since a 4th place finish in the 2007–08 season.

Statistics

|-
!colspan=14|Players who left during the season:

|}

Goals record

Disciplinary record

Transfers

Transfers in

Transfers out

Loans in

Loans out

Competitions

Pre-season friendlies
The Robins revealed they would face Bitton, Cheltenham Town, Shrewsbury Town and Bournemouth.

Championship

League table

Results by matchday

Result summary

Matches
On 21 June 2018, the EFL Championship fixtures for the forthcoming season were announced.

FA Cup

The third round draw was made live on BBC One by Ruud Gullit and Paul Ince from Stamford Bridge on 3 December 2018. The fourth round draw was made live on BBC One by Robbie Keane and Carl Ikeme from Wolverhampton on 7 January 2019. The fifth round draw was broadcast on 28 January 2019 live on BBC One, Alex Scott and Ian Wright conducted the draw.

EFL Cup

On 15 June 2018, the draw for the first round was made in Vietnam.

References

Bristol City
Bristol City F.C. seasons